Craspedonema elegans is a species of nematodes in the family Bunonematidae found in Brazil.

References

External links 

 

Bunonematidae
Nematodes described in 1928
Fauna of Brazil
Agricultural pest nematodes